is a Japanese footballer who plays as a defensive midfielder for  club Kashiwa Reysol.

Career statistics

Club

References

External links

1997 births
Living people
Sportspeople from Hokkaido
Association football people from Hokkaido
University of Tsukuba alumni
Japanese footballers
Association football midfielders
J1 League players
Hokkaido Consadole Sapporo players
Kashiwa Reysol players